Sweet Gum Head is an unincorporated community in Holmes County, Florida, United States. The community is located along Holmes County Road 2A near Holmes County Road 185.

References

Unincorporated communities in Holmes County, Florida
Unincorporated communities in Florida